ZCE may refer to:

Zend Certified Engineer
Zhengzhou Commodity Exchange